Jana Labáková (born 26 January 1966) is a Slovak gymnast. She competed in six events at the 1980 Summer Olympics.

References

1966 births
Living people
Slovak female artistic gymnasts
Olympic gymnasts of Czechoslovakia
Gymnasts at the 1980 Summer Olympics
People from Detva District
Sportspeople from the Banská Bystrica Region